Chen Qingyuan (born 15 February 1997) is a Chinese right-handed foil fencer. She won the silver medal in both the women's individual and team foil events at the 2022 Asian Fencing Championships held in Seoul, South Korea.

In 2018, she won the silver medal in the women's team foil event at the Asian Games held in Jakarta, Indonesia.

She won one of the bronze medals in the women's foil event at the 2019 Asian Fencing Championships held in Chiba, Japan. She also won the bronze medal in the women's team foil event. She also competed at the World Fencing Championships in 2018, 2019 and 2022.

References

External links 
 

Living people
1997 births
Place of birth missing (living people)
Chinese female foil fencers
Chinese female fencers
Asian Games medalists in fencing
Asian Games silver medalists for China
Medalists at the 2018 Asian Games
Fencers at the 2018 Asian Games
Fencers at the 2020 Summer Olympics
Olympic fencers of China
21st-century Chinese women